The International Dennis Gabor Award (1993-2010) was awarded by the NOVOFER Foundation of the Hungarian Academy of Sciences for outstanding scientific achievements with practical applications, with a clear positive attitude towards international cooperation of the researchers. It was named after the Nobel Prize winner Dennis Gabor. The award included a 130 mm-diameter pure silver medal with a hologram of Dennis Gabor’s portrait, a charter of honor, and a monetary prize. The award was normally awarded simultaneously to a Hungarian and to a non-Hungarian researcher and was not awarded every year but, on average, every 3 years or longer depending on the level of the candidates. The award was an honor to Dennis Gabor and aimed at identifying researchers with a likewise successful early career path as Dennis Gabor himself. Because of the high prestige of this award and the broad research area covered, selection of the awardee was extremely competitive, even more so for the non-Hungarian nominees. The award ceremony took place at the Hungarian Parliament.
The international Denis Gabor Award was awarded from 1993 until 2010. Since then, the NOVOFER organization continued to offer awards, but under a different name, such as the ‘’Denis Gabor in Memoriam Award’’, or the ‘’Denis Gabor Lifetime Achievement Award’’.

A different Dennis Gabor Award is presented each year by SPIE, the international society for optics and photonics, in recognition of outstanding accomplishments in diffractive wavefront technologies, especially those which further the development of holography and metrology applications.

Recipients

2010 
Vladimír Székely, born in Hungary in 1941. He contributed to semiconductor technology.

2009 
Warren Chan, researcher born in China in 1974 and a US citizen. He contributed to the application of nanotechnology in biology and medicine for the treatment of diseases such as cancer. He is a professor at the University of Toronto, Canada.
Dombi Péter, physicist, born in Szeged, Hungary in 1976. He contributed to optics, such as ultra-short pulses and high intensity laser technology.

2006 
Nico F. Declercq, physicist, born in Belgium in 1975. He contributed to ultrasonics of biased piezoelectric anisotropic crystals and diffraction of ultrasonic waves by periodic structures and the use of optics for these investigations. He later worked on the acoustics of Chichen Itza and Epidaurus. He is a professor at Georgia Institute of Technology, GA, USA and Georgia Tech Lorraine, Metz, France.
 Czirók András, physicist, born in Miskolc, Hungary in 1973. He works at University of Kansas Medical Center. He contributed to biological systems.

2003 
Pavel Alexandrovich Belov, physicist, born in Saint Petersburg in the Soviet Union in 1977. He contributed to photonic crystals.
Gali Ádám, engineer and physicist, born in Budapest, Hungary in 1973. He contributed to Atomic Physics, with a focus on point-defects in semiconductors.

2000 
Georg Pretzler, physicist, born in Graz, Austria in 1965 and a professor at the University of Munich. He contributed to quantum optics, rontgen-holography and high power laser and is a professor at the Heinrich-Heine-University Duesseldorf.
Baranyi Péter, electrical engineer, born in Kalocsa, Hungary in 1970. He graduated from Budapest University of Technology and contributed to Telecommunications and Telematics. He also worked at the University of Hong Kong, the University of New South Wales and the University of Tokyo.

1998 
Sándor Kürti, born in Hungary in 1947. Is famous for contributions to mathematics.

1996 
Chris J. Jacobsen, researcher, born in USA and worked at Los Alamos National Laboratory, New Mexico, USA. He contributed to holographic X-ray imaging of soft materials and received a Presidential Faculty Fellowship.
Szipőcs Róbert, electrical engineer, born in Hungary. He studied at Budapest University of Technology and contributed to chipped mirrors and the production of femtosecond light pulses.

1995 
Ernő Rubik, born in Hungary in 1944 and for his invention of Rubik's Cube.

1993 
Kristina M. Johnson, electrical engineer, born in Evansville,USA, in 1957. She was a faculty with the University of Colorado at Boulder at the time of the award.  She received her PhD from Stanford University. Later she has been undersecretary for Energy at the United States Department of Energy, provost and senior vice president for academic affairs at Johns Hopkins University and  dean of the Pratt School of Engineering at Duke University. She contributed to opto-electronic computing and holography.
Horváth Gábor, physicist, born in Kiskunhalas, Hungary, in 1963. He contributed to physiological and photoreceptor optics, optical problems in biology, and polarization vision in animals.

See also

 List of engineering awards
 List of physics awards

References 

Physics awards
International awards
Awards of the Hungarian Academy of Sciences